Asterix and Obelix vs. Caesar is a 1999 feature film directed by Claude Zidi, the first installment in the Asterix film series based on Goscinny and Uderzo's Astérix comics. The film combines plots of several Astérix stories, mostly Asterix the Gaul (Getafix's abduction), Asterix and the Soothsayer, Asterix and the Goths (the Druid conference), Asterix the Legionary (Obelix becoming smitten with Panacea) and Asterix the Gladiator (the characters fighting in the circus) but jokes and references from many other albums abound, including a humorous exchange between Caesar and Brutus taken from Asterix and Cleopatra, and the villain Lucius Detritus is based on Tullius Detritus, the main antagonist of Asterix and the Roman Agent (known as Tortuous Convolvulus in the English translation of the comic).

At the time of its release, the film was the most expensive production in French cinema of all time, making it the most expensive production in France for the twentieth century. It was a box-office success and would be followed by a sequel, Asterix & Obelix: Mission Cleopatra, released in 2002.

Plot 
Julius Caesar is celebrating his victory over all of Gaul, but Lucius Detritus has kept from him that one village has managed to resist them. Detritus travels to the garrison near the village where Caius Bonus (Crismus Bonus), the garrison's commanding Centurion, explains that the Gauls have a magic potion, which makes them invincible. Detritus decides to capture the potion for himself, and hearing that the clever Asterix and permanently invincible Obelix are the backbone of the Gaulish forces, attempts and fails to eliminate them.

A false soothsayer arrives at the village and predicts the arrival of Romans and treasure; despite Asterix's protests, the village believe him, wherefore when a Roman tax collector arrives, they drive off his forces and take the gold. The "soothsayer" later drugs and hypnotises Asterix to create a diversion while he recaptures the tax money; but news of the theft reaches Caesar, who comes to the garrison himself, demanding the legion attack. Upon witnessing the defeat of his army, he demands Detritus subdue the village or be fed to the lions.

Detritus disguises himself and some men as Druids and kidnaps Panoramix (Getafix) at a Druid conference. Asterix disguises Obelix as a legionary, and they enter the garrison to rescue the Druid, but are separated. Asterix joins Getafix in the dungeon, where the pair resist Detritus' demands to make the magic potion, until he tortures Idefix (Dogmatix). Detritus uses the potion to throw Caesar into a cell (locked in an iron mask), and takes command with an oblivious Obelix as his bodyguard. Obelix later helps Asterix, Getafix, Dogmatix, and Caesar escape.

Caesar co-operates with the Gauls to defeat Detritus, who mounts an attack on the villagers using his own magic potion. To defeat him, Panoramix brews a special version of the potion which creates dozens of duplicates of Asterix and Obelix. Caesar is returned to power, and grants the village its freedom.

Differences from the books
 It is revealed early in the film that the magic potion used by the Gauls only lasts for ten minutes. Such a short time limit is not implied in the original books, such as disguised legionary Caligula Minus holding a rock up for several hours in Asterix the Gaul or crooked adviser Codfix retaining superhuman strength until well into the daytime after drinking a ladleful of potion at night in Asterix and the Great Divide.
 In the book Asterix and the Roman Agent, a character named Detritus (in the original French version) was an agent of Caesar who was a master of manipulating people. In the movie Detritus appears to be more based on Crismus Bonus from Asterix the Gaul or Felonius Caucus from the book Asterix and the Big Fight.
 The fraudulent fortune-teller Prolix is based on the character of the same name in Asterix and the Soothsayer; as in the book, Asterix is the only villager who does not believe Prolix's false prophecies. In the film, Prolix manages to escape with stolen gold (which he conned the villagers into stealing from the Romans) and is not seen again, whereas in the book Prolix is ultimately exposed as a phony when the Gauls managed to surprise him (thereby proving he could not really see the future).
 The plotline of someone stealing a chest filled with gold comes from Asterix and the Cauldron, where Asterix is tasked with guarding a cauldron filled with money belonging to Whosemoralsarelastix, the chief of a fellow Gaulish village. The aforementioned is the one who has the gold stolen back from the village in order to avoid paying his taxes to the Romans as opposed to the soothsayer Prolix who does so in the film. Additionally, in the book the money is stolen by making a hole in the back of Asterix's hut while Asterix stands guard in the front of his house. In the film, Asterix is drugged and hypnotized into believing Obelix is Caesar resulting in a fight and causing a distraction for Prolix and his associates to steal the money and escape.
 Getafix's great-grandfather, who appears in the movie, is not mentioned in any of the books.
 In the books, Obelix's affection for Panacea was mostly comedic. In the movie, the romance is played for dramatic effect and is taken much more seriously.
 The unnamed wife of village elder Geriatrix is depicted as intensely concerned about her husband getting hurt in the film (she runs after him desperately telling him to not join in when the villagers have a fish fight and later when they attack a Roman legion) - in the books Mrs Geriatrix seems to be casually dominant over her husband, who humbly does everything she tells him to.

Cast

Music

Soundtrack
Soundtrack by Jean-Jacques Goldman and Roland Romanelli
 "Elle ne me voit pas" - 4:26
 "Lei non vede me" - 4:26
 "Asterix et Obelix contre César" - 2:20
 "L'Embuscade" - 2:07
 "L'Amour" - 3:52
 "Le Cirque Encore" - 5:15
 "La Serpe D'or" - 4:07
 "Falbala" - 1:48
 "Le Devin" - 2:43
 "L'Amour Toujours" - 3:45
 "Les Hallucinations D'Astérix" - 2:56
 "La Potion Magique" - 3:14
 "Bélenos" - 7:18
 "Obélix" - 3:44

Reception

Accolades
 Golden Screen (1999)
 Bogey Award in Silver (1999)
 Bavarian Film Award (2000)

Video game

An action video game based on the film, developed by Tek 5 and published by Cryo Interactive, was released for the PlayStation and the PC.

References

External links
 
 
 

1999 films
1990s adventure comedy films
1990s children's comedy films
1990s fantasy comedy films
French adventure films
French fantasy comedy films
French children's films
Italian children's films
German children's films
1990s French-language films
Films directed by Claude Zidi
Films produced by Claude Berri
Asterix films
Films about Julius Caesar
Cultural depictions of Marcus Junius Brutus
1999 comedy films
1990s French films